Morgan is an unincorporated village in southern Laclede County, Missouri, United States. It is located approximately eleven miles south of Lebanon at the intersection of Missouri Supplemental Routes J and PP. Conway is approximately seven miles to the west. The Osage Fork flows past 1.5 miles to the south. There is a combined grocery store and gas station located in Morgan, along with numerous houses.

History
A post office at Morgan was established in 1896, and remained in operation until 1975. The community bears the name of Asa Morgan, a local Civil War veteran.

References

Unincorporated communities in Laclede County, Missouri
Unincorporated communities in Missouri